Paulo Jorge Vida Ribeiro (born 9 December 1971) is a Portuguese former footballer who is last known to have played as a striker for Ribeirão.

Career

In 1996, Vida signed for French second division side Châteauroux.

Vida was the top scorer of the 2002–03 Taça de Portugal with 5 goals.

Honours

Club
União de Leiria
Segunda Liga: 1997–98

Paços de Ferreira
Segunda Liga: 1999–2000

Individual
Segunda Liga Top Goalscorer: 1995–96, 2001–02
Taça de Portugal Top Goalscorer: 2002–03 Taça de Portugal

References

External links
 
 
 

Portuguese footballers
Living people
Association football forwards
Expatriate footballers in France
Portuguese expatriate footballers
Portuguese expatriate sportspeople in France
1971 births
Ligue 2 players
Liga Portugal 2 players
LB Châteauroux players
US Créteil-Lusitanos players
Primeira Liga players
F.C. Paços de Ferreira players
Varzim S.C. players
S.C. Campomaiorense players
F.C. Penafiel players
Gil Vicente F.C. players
Associação Académica de Coimbra – O.A.F. players
U.D. Leiria players
Odivelas F.C. players
C.F. Estrela da Amadora players
C.D. Aves players
G.D. Estoril Praia players
S.C. Dragões Sandinenses players
Footballers from Lisbon